Joseph Nye Welch (October 22, 1890 – October 6, 1960) was an American lawyer and actor who served as the chief counsel for the United States Army while it was under investigation for Communist activities by Senator Joseph McCarthy's Senate Permanent Subcommittee on Investigations, an investigation known as the Army–McCarthy hearings.  His confrontation with McCarthy during the hearings, in which he famously asked McCarthy "At long last, have you left no sense of decency?" is seen as a turning point in the history of McCarthyism.

Early life 
Welch was born in Primghar, Iowa, on October 22, 1890, the seventh and youngest child of English immigrants Martha (Thyer) and William Welch. He attended Grinnell College and graduated Phi Beta Kappa in 1914, then attended Harvard Law School and graduated in 1917, magna cum laude, with the second highest grade point average in his graduating class. Welch married Judith Lyndon on September 20, 1917. They had two sons, Joe and Lyndon. He enlisted in the United States Army for World War I.  After joining as a private in August 1918, he applied for a commission.  Welch was attending officer training school at Camp Zachary Taylor, Kentucky, when the Armistice took place.  His services no longer required, Welch was discharged from the Army on November 27, 1918.

Career
Beginning in 1923, Welch was a partner at Hale and Dorr, a Boston law firm, and lived in nearby Walpole, Massachusetts.

Army–McCarthy hearings 
On June 9, 1954, the 30th day of the Army–McCarthy hearings, Welch challenged Roy Cohn to provide U.S. Attorney General Herbert Brownell Jr. with McCarthy's list of 130 Communists or subversives in defense plants "before sundown". McCarthy stepped in and said that if Welch was so concerned about persons aiding the Communist Party, he should check on a man in his Boston law office named Fred Fisher, who had once belonged to the National Lawyers Guild, which Brownell had called "the legal mouthpiece of the Communist Party".
Welch had privately discussed the matter with Fisher beforehand and the two agreed Fisher should not participate in the hearings. Welch dismissed Fisher's association with the NLG as a youthful indiscretion and attacked McCarthy for naming the young man before a nationwide television audience without prior warning or previous agreement to do so:

When McCarthy tried to renew his attack, Welch interrupted him:

McCarthy tried to ask Welch another question about Fisher, and Welch interrupted:

At this, those watching the proceedings broke into applause. Welch's TV performance turned the tide of public and press opinion against McCarthy overnight. In July, a Republican senator introduced a motion, which passed later that year, censuring McCarthy for acts that “tended to bring the Senate into dishonor and disrepute, to obstruct the constitutional processes of the Senate, and to impair its dignity.”

Acting
Welch played a Michigan judge in Otto Preminger's Anatomy of a Murder (1959). He said he took the role because "it looked like that was the only way I'd ever get to be a judge." Welch actually took the part on the condition that his wife, Agnes, would be in the film. She was cast as a juror. He was nominated for a Golden Globe Award for Best Supporting Actor – Motion Picture and a BAFTA Award for Best Newcomer for the role. He also narrated the television shows Omnibus and Dow Hour of Great Mysteries.

Personal life
His first wife, Judith Lyndon, died on December 21, 1956, and he married Agnes Rodgers Brown in 1957. After remarrying, he moved to Harwichport, Massachusetts, on Cape Cod, where he lived until his death.

Sixteen days before his 70th birthday, and fifteen months after the release of Anatomy of a Murder, Welch suffered a heart attack and died on October 6, 1960, at Cape Cod Hospital in Hyannis, Massachusetts.

In popular culture
 The documentary film Point of Order! (1964) includes excerpts from the Army–McCarthy hearings.
 In the 1977 NBC biopic Tail Gunner Joe, Welch was played by Burgess Meredith.
 The rock band R.E.M. sampled some of the audio from the Army–McCarthy hearings for their song "Exhuming McCarthy", on their album Document (1987).
 In Tony Kushner's 1991 play Angels in America, when the gay liberal Louis finds out that his lover Joe works for Roy Cohn, he taunts him, saying, Have you no sense of decency, sir? At long last, have you no sense of decency?' Who said that?"
 In the 1992 HBO film Citizen Cohn, Welch was played by Ed Flanders.
 The 2005 film Good Night, and Good Luck, which dramatized the work of television journalists Edward R. Murrow and Fred Friendly at CBS, uses footage of the Army–McCarthy hearings, including Welch's challenge to McCarthy.

Filmography

References

External links

 
 McCarthy–Welch exchange: "Have You No Sense of Decency" (transcript and sound file)
 History of Wilmer Cutler Pickering Hale and Dorr

1890 births
1960 deaths
20th-century American lawyers
United States Army personnel of World War I
American people of English descent
Grinnell College alumni
Harvard Law School alumni
Massachusetts lawyers
McCarthyism
People from Harwich, Massachusetts
People from O'Brien County, Iowa
People from Walpole, Massachusetts
Wilmer Cutler Pickering Hale and Dorr partners